Lemuel Franklin Smith (April 21, 1890 – October 15, 1956) was a Virginia lawyer and judge. He was born in Albemarle County, Virginia. He attended local schools and later received his Bachelor of Arts degree from Randolph Macon College where he was a member of the Kappa Sigma fraternity. After teaching for three years at Randolph Macon Academy, he entered law school at the University of Virginia where he received his law degree in 1916. Shortly after that, he and John S. Battle opened a law office in Charlottesville. He was a member of Charlottesville's City Council, a member of the Virginia House of Delegates, Commonwealth's Attorney for Albemarle County, judge of the Eighth Judicial Circuit and, in 1951, was elected to the Supreme Court of Appeals of Virginia. He served on the court until his death. Justice Smith received an honorary LL. D. from Randolph Macon in 1951.

His great nephew, James H. Smith, followed in his footsteps and became Commonwealth's attorney and Juvenile and Domestics Relations judge. He was also a member of the Kappa Sigma Fraternity.

Justices of the Supreme Court of Virginia
Virginia lawyers
Randolph–Macon College alumni
University of Virginia School of Law alumni
1890 births
1956 deaths
20th-century American judges
20th-century American lawyers
Virginia circuit court judges